Vic Dyson Pays is a 1925 American silent Western film directed by Jacques Jaccard and starring Ben F. Wilson, Neva Gerber and Joseph W. Girard.

Cast
 Ben F. Wilson as 'Mad' Vic Dyson 
 Archie Ricks as Skip
 Neva Gerber as Neva
 Victor Allen as Madden 
 Merrill McCormick as Albert Stacey
 Joseph W. Girard as Dayton Keever
 Dad Learned as Dr. Crandall

References

Bibliography
 Connelly, Robert B. The Silents: Silent Feature Films, 1910-36, Volume 40, Issue 2. December Press, 1998.
 Langman, Larry. A Guide to Silent Westerns. Greenwood Publishing Group, 1992.
 Munden, Kenneth White. The American Film Institute Catalog of Motion Pictures Produced in the United States, Part 1. University of California Press, 1997.

External links
 

1925 films
1925 Western (genre) films
1920s English-language films
American silent feature films
Silent American Western (genre) films
American black-and-white films
Films directed by Jacques Jaccard
Arrow Film Corporation films
1920s American films